Jacobus Johannes de Kock (born  in Paarl) is a South African rugby union player, currently playing with the . His regular position is full-back or fly-half.

Career

Youth, club and Varsity rugby

De Kock played schoolboy rugby for Paarl Boys' High School before enrolling at the  academy in 2007. He played for the  side in 2007 and for the  side in 2008, missing out in 2009 due to injuries.

In 2013, he represented  in the Varsity Cup competition. He finished as the top scorer in the competition, scoring five tries and 22 conversions.

Sharks

He scored a total of seven tries during the competition (which was joint fourth in the competition) and also scored seven conversions, to end the season with a total of 49 points.

Lazio

After the 2011 Vodacom Cup, De Kock moved to Italy, where he joined National Championship of Excellence side Lazio. He played in 17 matches for them, scoring 144 points to help Lazio finish in sixth place.

Return to South Africa

He returned to South Africa after one season at Lazio and played for Durban-based club side College Rovers. He scored a try and a 58-meter penalty late in the game to help College Rovers win the 2012 National Club Championships, the last edition of that tournament before being relaunched as the SARU Community Cup. He was also named Backline Player of the Tournament.

Golden Lions

He joined Johannesburg-based side  for the 2013 season. In addition to playing in the Varsity Cup competition, he also made three appearances in the 2013 Vodacom Cup.

He was also included in the  wider training squad for the 2014 Super Rugby season.

References

South African rugby union players
Living people
1988 births
Sportspeople from Paarl
Golden Lions players
Sharks (Currie Cup) players
Rugby union fly-halves
Rugby union players from the Western Cape